Argyrostrotis is a genus of moths in the family Erebidae. The genus was erected by Jacob Hübner in 1821.

Species
 Argyrostrotis anilis Drury, 1773
 Argyrostrotis deleta Guenée, 1852
 Argyrostrotis erasa Guenée, 1852
 Argyrostrotis flavistriaria Hübner, 1831
 Argyrostrotis quadrifilaris Hübner, 1831
 Argyrostrotis sylvarum Guenée, 1852

References

Poaphilini
Noctuoidea genera